is a Japanese vocalist, most famously featured on Final Fantasy: Pray and Final Fantasy: Love Will Grow albums.  She sings in at least five languages: Japanese (her primary language), English, French, Brazilian Portuguese, and Italian (on Genso Suikoden Vocal album "La passione commuove la Storia").

She also sang an image song for Sailor Uranus from Sailor Moon, which was called "Inisharu U" (Initial U.)  However Ohki was not the voice actress for the character, she was filling in whilst Megumi Ogata was busy with her role as Shinji Ikari in Neon Genesis Evangelion. She sang as part of a six-member backing choir for the song "At the Gala" in the Japanese dub of My Little Pony: Friendship Is Magic, and voiced the mother of Whale in the Japanese dub of Magic Adventures of Mumfie.

References 

Living people
Year of birth missing (living people)